Arriba Argentinos (English: Get Up Argentines) is an Argentine news program, anchored by Marcelo Bonelli and broadcast in El Trece, Mondays to Fridays from 7:00 a.m. to 9:30 a.m.

The original format of the program is that people needs to get informed of "all that they need to know before leave home every morning, with constant updates of the weather, traffic reports and the state of the public services. Every half-hour top stories are reviewed.

History
The program premiered on Monday, April 25, 2005, then anchored by Débora Pérez Volpin and Juan Micelli, the last stepped down in anchoring at late-2005 and was replaced by Marcelo Bonelli. Since its inception Arriba Argentinos has used as opening theme the song "Un paso más allá" by Narcotango.

Awards and nominations
Martín Fierro Award 2007 – Nominated

Staff
 Anchors: Débora Pérez Volpin (2005-2017) and Marcelo Bonelli (2005–present) 
 Sports news: Pablo Gravellone
 Weather: Nazarena Di Serio 
 Show biz: Jimena Grandinetti
 Traffic news: Alejandro Ramos

External links
 Arriba Argentinos El Trece
 Arriba Argentinos Artear

2005 Argentine television series debuts
2000s Argentine television series
2010s Argentine television series
El Trece original programming
Breakfast television